Okeanobatidae is a family of millipedes belonging to the order Julida.

Genera:
 Okeanobates Verhoeff, 1939
 Yosidaiulus Takakuwa, 1940

References

Julida